Pak Wing Chak (born 23 April 1990 in Hong Kong), is a former Hong Kong professional footballer who played as a left-back. He is now a police.

Early years
Pak studied in Buddhist Wong Fung Ling College for secondary school years.

Club career

Hong Kong 09
Pak started his football career in Hong Kong Third 'District' Division League club Hong Kong 09. He was a regular starting XI as the left-back. During his 2 years spent in the club, he played 31 league games.

Workable
In the 2007–08 season, Pak signed his first professional football career contract Workable, a newly promoted team playing in the First Division. However, the team dissolved at the end of the season.

Eastern
Following Workable manager Chan Hiu Ming's and coach Lee Kin Wo's footstep, Pak joined another First Division League club Eastern in the 2008–09 season.

Sun Hei
Pak joined Sun Hei for an undisclosed fee in the summer of 2009.

On 16 October 2011, he scored a goal in the 57th minute, helping the team to win over Sham Shui Po 5–0 at Mong Kok Stadium. The match was the first competitive league game after Mong Kok Stadium renovation work was completed. The goal was also his first goal for Sun Hei, as well as his first First Division League goal.

Eastern
On 1 June 2013, Pak rejoined newly promoted First Division club Eastern.

Career statistics

Club
 As of 6 May 2013

International

Hong Kong U23
As of 23 June 2011

References

1990 births
Living people
Association football defenders
Hong Kong footballers
Hong Kong First Division League players
Hong Kong Premier League players
Hong Kong international footballers
Shek Kip Mei SA players
Eastern Sports Club footballers
Sun Hei SC players
Southern District FC players
Footballers at the 2010 Asian Games
Asian Games competitors for Hong Kong
Hong Kong League XI representative players